In the warez scene, to nuke is to label content as "bad", for reasons which might include unusable software, bad audiovisual quality, virus-infected content, deceptively labeled (fake) content or not following the rules. Duplicates and stolen releases from other pirates that do not attribute the original pirates will also be nuked. When a scene release is "nuked", a message is attached to its listing informing other sceners of its "nuked" status, as well as the specific nature of the problem.

Contrary to what the term implies, a nuke does not actually destroy offending content or prevent anyone from downloading it. A nuke merely serves as a cautionary flag to potential users. The person that uploaded the nuked content to a site will lose credits.

History
Dupe checkers first showed up on BBSes to help sysops nuke duplicate uploads. It kept a history of releases that were moved offline by storing the DIZ files included in the ZIPs. These dupe check scripts or programs allows users to search warez releases by date or name. It allows couriers to check when a release already exists on a site and the release groups avoid duplicating an earlier release of another group.

At the end of the 1990s, the various IRC dupe checks were the simplest to use. The most popular dupe checks were ran out of #releases and #thescene. In 1998 a new kind of dupe check appeared. Katman, a siteop of Quadcon (QC), created a native win95 program named WinDupe. It let the user connect to an SQL database, offering greater speed and flexibility over the IRC bots. Drink Or Die created the first web dupe check.

Issuing and removing nukes

Global nukes
Titles can only be officially labeled as "nuked" by people who have special access to a listing database, often referred to as "nukers". The nuke is issued by a nuke command in a nuke channel. For example:
 !nuke release reason [source]             (nukes a release)
 !unnuke release reason [source]           (unnukes a release)
 !renuke release reason [source]           (renukes a release)
 !modnuke release reason [source]          (modifies a nuke reason)
 !snuke release reason [source]            (a silent nuke: not announced in announce channels)
 !oldnuke release reason [source]          (for old releases, also a silent nuke)
Erroneous nukes are usually "un-nuked" easily, by the same people who have access to issue nukes, that nukes and unnukes happen on IRC. These nuke networks have their own guidelines on how to nuke a release. In 2008, twelve of those nuke networks created a coalition to work together "to ensure nukers bias, nukewars and many other problems that plague the nuke scene become a thing of the past."

Local nukes

Local nukes or site nukes can be issued by a topsite administrator and are only applicable to that site. Each individual site has rules for which kind of releases that are allowed. e.g. no VCD releases. Hence a locally nuked release can still be valid.

Nukewars
The situation where a release is nuked or unnuked more than four times is called a nukewar.

Example of a nukewar. The first two columns represent the time when the release was pred or when a nuke was issued. The next column is the category of the release. In this example two releases were released at almost the same time.
 2007-03-08 04:15:26    TV       Crossing.Jordan.S06E07.HDTV.XviD-NoTV
 2007-03-08 04:15:32    TV       Crossing.Jordan.S06E07.HDTV.XviD-XOR
 2007-03-08 04:16:16    NUKES    Crossing.Jordan.S06E07.HDTV.XviD-NoTV  NUKED   dupe.XOR.same.day
 2007-03-08 04:20:21    NUKES    Crossing.Jordan.S06E07.HDTV.XviD-XOR   NUKED   lost.race.to.NoTV
 2007-03-08 04:21:59    NUKES    Crossing.Jordan.S06E07.HDTV.XviD-NoTV  NUKED   dupe.XOR.03-07-2007
 2007-03-08 04:22:46    NUKES    Crossing.Jordan.S06E07.HDTV.XviD-NoTV  UNNUKE  fix
 2007-03-08 04:23:12    NUKES    Crossing.Jordan.S06E07.HDTV.XviD-NoTV  NUKED   dupe.XOR.2007-03-07
 2007-03-08 04:23:46    NUKES    Crossing.Jordan.S06E07.HDTV.XviD-NoTV  UNNUKE  NoTV.pred.first
 2007-03-08 04:24:47    NUKES    Crossing.Jordan.S06E07.HDTV.XviD-XOR   NUKED   dupe.NoTV.2007-03-08
 2007-03-08 04:38:41    NUKES    Crossing.Jordan.S06E07.HDTV.XviD-XOR   UNNUKE  is.fine
 2007-03-08 04:39:23    NUKES    Crossing.Jordan.S06E07.HDTV.XviD-NoTV  NUKED   dupe.XOR.2007-03-08
 2007-03-08 05:18:23    NUKES    Crossing.Jordan.S06E07.HDTV.XviD-NoTV  UNNUKE  won.race
 2007-03-08 05:18:50    NUKES    Crossing.Jordan.S06E07.HDTV.XviD-XOR   NUKED   dupe.NoTV.2007-08-03
 2007-03-08 05:20:22    NUKES    Crossing.Jordan.S06E07.HDTV.XviD-XOR   UNNUKE  fixing
 2007-03-08 05:24:03    NUKES    Crossing.Jordan.S06E07.HDTV.XviD-XOR   UNNUKE  fix_won.race.against.NoTV
Another source shows different timestamps. 
The clock of a computer is not always accurate. This and the difference in time zone partially explain the time difference. This shows why this nukewar was started.
 2007-03-08 03:14:07    TV-XVID  Crossing.Jordan.S06E07.HDTV.XviD-XOR
 2007-03-08 03:14:14    TV-XVID  Crossing.Jordan.S06E07.HDTV.XviD-NoTV

ZoNeNET, EthNet and oneNET confirmed the precedent to leave both releases unnuked when groups pre within the same second. This did not prevent a small nukewar between the LocalNet and SanctityDenied networks in 2020.

 The.Game.S06E18.HDTV.x264-ASAP 
   NUKE   dupe.EVOLVE.2013-08-21/ZoNeNET
   UNNUKE fine_pred.same.second.so.both.rls.are.fine/ZoNeNET

 The.Walking.Dead.S04E12.PROPER.HDTV.x264-2HD
   NUKE   dupe.KILLERS.2014-03-03/ZoNeNET
   UNNUKE fine_both.pred.within.one.second.of.each.other_basis.has.been.to.leave.both.alone_
          see.zonenets.unnuke.on.The.Game.S06E18.HDTV.x264-ASAP/EthNet
   NUKE   dupe.KILLERS.2014-03-03_KILLERS.won.the.proper/ZoNeNET
   UNNUKE fine_groups.pred.within.the.same.second_precedent.is.to.leave.both.unnuked/oneNET

Another example is the nukewar about the TDRS2K10 ruleset. The name between the square brackets is the nuke network where the nuke originates from. Each of those networks in this example was also a council member network.

 Nuked on 2009-11-14 15:15:09 [LocalNet]
     crap_signing.grps.are.crap_for.small.changes.create.a.adendum
 Unnuked on 2009-11-14 15:20:56 [oneNET]
     this.ruleset.is.real.and.legit.leave.it.alone
 Nuked on 2009-11-14 20:51:10 [Nuclear]
     signing.grps.are.crap_for.small.changes.create.an.adendum.or.rebuttal.to.tdrs2k9_invalid.ruleset
 Unnuked on 2009-11-14 20:52:23 [LocalNet]
     invalid.nuke_nukenets.do.not.have.the.authority.to.invalidate.rulesets_such.things.are.left.to.section.groups.and.leaders
 Nuked on 2009-11-14 20:52:25 [Nuclear]
     signing.grps.are.crap_for.small.changes.create.an.adendum.or.rebuttal.to.tdrs2k9_invalid.ruleset
 Unnuked on 2009-11-14 20:52:26 [LocalNet]
     invalid.nuke_nukenets.do.not.have.the.authority.to.invalidate.rulesets_such.things.are.left.to.section.groups.and.leaders
 Nuked on 2009-11-14 21:23:31 [Nuclear]
     no.leading.groups.signed_valid.nuke_2k5.was.rewritten.with.2k9.inserts_release.a.rebuttal.or.addendum
 Unnuked on 2009-11-14 21:55:04 [LocalNet]
     invalid.nuke_nukenets.do.not.have.the.authority.to.invalidate.rulesets_such.things.are.left.to.section.groups.and.leaders_it.is.not.your.duty.to.decide.which.groups.are.good.enough

Examples
Examples of content that could be "nuked" include non-working software, non-working cracks, videos with out-of-sync audio, watermarked videos, or music recordings with excessive "skips". The reason for a nuke is based on violations of the standards that must be followed.

Pre network
A pre network (aka a Nukenet) is a collection of databases which share information about releases among the members of the network. There are approximately 20 different pre networks. Peers can be linked to more than one network. Linking to other network provides information which isn't available on peers local pre network. Such information can be .sfv, .m3u, .jpg, .diz or .nfo files.

Pre database
Each release that gets released will result as a record in a pre-database or dupe check. 
This record will at least contain the time the release was released and the release name (the name of the folder that contains the files of the release). 
The size and nature of the release are often provided too. 
Nukes are linked with their release in these databases when a nuke is issued. To check if a release is nuked, a scener uses an IRC channel to query the database by typing commands. These IRC channels are called pre channels and are often not accessible for the general public. 
The database is updated automatically through spidering topsites or by catching pre-release announcements from site channels.
The purpose of these different worldwide and mirrored pre databases is to check for fakes and that for example a music album or movie isn't pred more than once and thus reducing traffic.

List of public predb websites 
There are now several public websites and IRC channels that list the contents of pre-databases. Most of them are regularly updated and show nuke reasons next to their release. They can be regularly down, very slow when searching or disappeared entirely. The server time is shown on some of them. According to TorrentFreak these websites are "simple archives of information that cannot be claimed by copyright holders, but anti-piracy companies apparently cannot tell the difference between reporting news and offering pirate releases for download."
 https://predb.org/ 
 https://predb.pw/
 https://pre.corrupt-net.org/ or https://pr3.us/  - 7.5 million releases
 https://predb.me/ - More than 7.9 million releases in the database.
 IRC Server: irc.zenet.org port: +6697

Pre channel
A pre channel is an IRC channel in which a prebot announces new warez (pre) releases in real time. Pre channels are generally provided as a convenience to members of the scene, often in conjunction with a topsite. Pre channels are typically private.

Advantages:
 Members of a pre channel are notified about new warez releases as they are released. This is of particular benefit to couriers and release groups.
 Pre channels commonly announce when a release is nuked or un-nuked.
 Pre channels provide a search facility that allows users to find out if a release exists, when it was released, and if it has been nuked. This function may also be used by release groups to avoid dupes (duplicates).
 Pre channels are also used for topsites to measure how fast they received the release, otherwise known as the pretime.
Disadvantages:
 Pre channels are often supplied with events from other pre channels, so spam may spread quickly. Many prebots employ elaborate filters to ensure only valid release events are announced.
 It just gives you the release name and no quality details, plot/features or links to downloads.

List of public IRC pre channels 
 http://filenetworks.blogspot.com/2010/09/corrupt-net-new-p2p-friendly-irc.html
 http://filenetworks.blogspot.com/2010/12/list-of-public-pre-trace-services-to.html
 https://opentrackers.org/links/warez-scene/#rlsdb

Prebot
A prebot is commonly known as an automated script in IRC channels that announces new releases and can let users query its database to view past warez release dates and nukes, among other things. Another kind of prebot was adopted in 2000 due to the increased competition among release groups. This prebot automatically distributed new releases to affiliated topsites of a group to release faster and more efficiently. This solved geographical and time zone related issues.

See also 
 Standard (warez)
 Topsite (warez)
 Warez scene
 Warez group

References

External links 
 RLSLOG Nuke Dictionary - List of common scene nukes for Xvid movies.
 NUKE pHun - Collection of funny or weird nukes.
 Scene Lingo - What does "NUKED" mean?
 Public predb dumps - SQL database backups.

Warez